In the 2001 book The Unfinished Twentieth Century, author Jonathan Schell suggests that an essential feature of the twentieth century was the development of humankind's capacity for self-destruction, with the rise in many forms of "policies of extermination". Schell goes on to suggest that the world now faces a clear choice between the abolition of all nuclear weapons, and full nuclearization, as the necessary technology and materials diffuse around the globe.

See also
List of books about nuclear issues
Nuclear disarmament

References

2001 books
2001 in the environment
American non-fiction books
British non-fiction books
Books about nuclear issues